O.K, U.K! is an extended play (EP) by the Australian rock band The Sports. The EP was recorded in the United Kingdom in 1979, during the band's Graham Parker tour. Parker, who personally requested them as his support, and to do some recording at Stiff Records.

The EP was released in August 1979. According to the Kent Music Report, sales counted towards the single title, "Wedding Ring"; however, according to The Australian Music Database, the EP itself was named as charting. Either way, this 4-track recording peaked at number 40 on the Kent Music Report.

The EP has since been released on iTunes.

Track listing

Charts

Footnotes

References

1979 EPs
EPs by Australian artists
The Sports albums